In the history of English phonology, there have been many diachronic sound changes affecting vowels, especially involving phonemic splits and mergers. A number of these changes are specific to vowels which occur before .

Historical diphthongization before /l/

Diphthongization occurred since Early Modern English in certain -al- and -ol- sequences before coronal or velar consonants, or at the end of a word or morpheme. In these sequences,  became  and then , while  became  and then .

At the end of a word or morpheme, this produced all, ball, call, fall, gall, hall, mall, small, squall, stall, pall, tall, thrall, wall, control, droll, extol, knoll, poll (meaning a survey of people,) roll, scroll, stroll, swollen, toll, and troll.  The word shall did not follow this trend, and remains  today.

Before coronal consonants, this produced Alderney, alter, bald, balderdash, false, falter, halt, malt, palsy, salt, Wald, Walter, bold, cold, fold, gold, hold, molten, mould/mold, old, shoulder (earlier sholder), smolder, told, and wold (in the sense of "tract of land").  As with shall, the word shalt did not follow this trend, and remains  today.

Before , this produced balk, caulk/calk, chalk, Dundalk, falcon, stalk, talk, walk, folk, Polk, and yolk.

This L-vocalization established a pattern that would influence the spelling pronunciations of some relatively more recent loanwords like Balt, Malta, waltz, Yalta, and polder.  It also influenced English spelling reform efforts, explaining the American English mold and molt vs. the traditional mould and moult.

Certain words of more recent origin or coining, however, do not have the change and retain short vowels, including Al, alcohol, bal, Cal, calcium, gal, Hal, mal-, pal, Sal, talc, Val, doll, Moll, and Poll (a nickname for a parrot.)

Historical L-vocalization
In most circumstances, the changes stopped there. But in -alk and -olk words, the  disappeared entirely in most accents (with the notable exception of Hiberno-English). Even outside Ireland, some of these words have more than one pronunciation that retains the  sound, especially in American English where spelling pronunciations caused partial or full reversal of L-vocalization in a handful of cases:

The word falcon existed simultaneously as homonyms  and falcon in Middle English. The word moult/molt never originally had  to begin with, instead deriving from Middle English mout and related etymologically to mutate; the  joined the word intrusively.

Variation between /ɔːl/ and /ɒl/ in salt and similar words
Some words such as salt that traditionally had /ɔːl/ for most RP speakers have alternative pronunciations with /ɒl/ that are used more frequently by younger British English speakers. This variation between /ɔːl/ and /ɒl/ occurs primarily before voiceless consonants, as in salt, false and alter, although it may also occur less commonly in words such as scald and bald where the /l/ comes before a voiced consonant. In England, this laxing before /l/ was traditionally associated with the north but has in recent decades become more widespread, including among younger speakers of RP.

Modern L-vocalization
The resulting sound may not always be rounded. The precise phonetic quality varies. It can be heard occasionally in the dialect of the English East Midlands, where words ending in -old can be pronounced . KM Petyt (1985) noted this feature in the traditional dialect of West Yorkshire but said it has died out. However, in recent decades l-vocalization has been spreading outwards from London and the south east,  John C Wells argued that it is probable that it will become the standard pronunciation in England over the next one hundred years, an idea which Petyt criticised in a book review.

Graham Shorrocks noted extensive L-vocalisation in the dialect of Bolton, Greater Manchester and commented, "many, perhaps, associate such a quality more with Southern dialects, than with Lancashire/Greater Manchester."

African-American English (AAE) dialects may have L-vocalization as well.  However, in these dialects, it may be omitted altogether (e.g. fool becomes .  Some English speakers from San Francisco - particularly those of Asian ancestry - also vocalize or omit .

Salary–celery merger
Norfolk Island-Pitcairn English (Pitkern Norfolk) , University of Queensland, 2006 The merger is not well studied. It is referred to in various sociolinguistic publications, but usually only as a small section of the larger change undergone by vowels preceding  in articles about l-vocalization.

This merger has been detected in the English spoken in New Zealand and in parts of the Australian state of Victoria, including the capital Melbourne.The /el/-/æl/ Sound Change in Australian English:  A Preliminary Perception Experiment, Deborah Loakes, John Hajek and Janet Fletcher, University of Melbourne
The merger is also found in the Norfuk dialect spoken on Norfolk Island. The salary-celery merger is also characteristic of Chicano English in Los Angeles and has been attested in the Chicano English of northern New Mexico and Albuquerque as well.
 is also often lowered before  in El Paso, but not all speakers show a merger.
In varieties with the merger, salary and celery are both pronounced .

The study presented by Cox and Palethorpe at a 2003 conference tested just one group of speakers from Victoria: 13 fifteen-year-old girls from a Catholic girls' school in Wangaratta. Their pronunciations were compared with those of school girl groups in the towns of Temora, Junee and Wagga Wagga in New South Wales. In the study conducted by Cox and Palethorpe, the group in Wangaratta exhibited the merger while speakers in Temora, Junee and Wagga Wagga did not.

Deborah Loakes from Melbourne University has suggested that the salary-celery merger is restricted to Melbourne and southern Victoria, not being found in northern border towns such as Albury-Wodonga or Mildura.

In the 2003 study Cox and Palethorpe note that the merger appears to only involve lowering of /e/ before /l/, with the reverse not occurring, stating that "There is no evidence in this data of raised /æ/ before /l/ as in 'Elbert' for 'Albert', a phenomenon that has been popularly suggested for Victorians."

 investigates the effects of postvocalic  on the preceding vowels in New Zealand English; her investigation covers all of the New Zealand English vowels and is not specifically tailored to studying mergers and neutralizations, but rather the broader change that occurs across the vowels. She has suggested that further research involving minimal pairs like telly and tally, celery and salary should be done before any firm conclusions are drawn.

A pilot study of the merger was done, which yielded perception and production data from a few New Zealand speakers. The finding has been interesting to some linguists because it concurs with the recent understanding that losing a distinction between two sounds involves losing the ability to produce it as well as to perceive it (Gordon 2002). However, due to the very small number of people participating in the study the results are not conclusive.

Fill–feel merger

The fill–feel merger is a conditioned merger of the vowels  and  before  that occurs in some accents. In Europe, it is commonly found in Estuary English. Otherwise it is typical of certain accents of American English. The heaviest concentration of the merger is found in, but not necessarily confined to, Southern American English: in North Carolina, eastern Tennessee, northern Alabama, Mississippi, Louisiana (but not New Orleans), and west-central Texas (Labov, Ash, and Boberg 2006: 69-73). This merger, like many other features of Southern American English, can also be found in AAE.

Fell–fail merger
In addition to North Carolina and Texas, these mergers are found sporadically in other Southern states and in the Midwest and West.

Full–fool merger
The main concentration of the pull–pool merger is in Western Pennsylvania English, centered around Pittsburgh. The merger is less consistently but still noticeably present in some speakers of surrounding Midland American English. The Atlas of North American English also reports this merger, or near-merger, scattered sporadically throughout Western American English, with particular prevalence in some speakers of urban Utahn, Californian, and New Mexican English.

The fill–feel merger and full–fool merger are not unified in American English; they are found in different parts of the country, and very few people show both mergers.

Hull–hole merger
The merger is also mentioned by Labov, Ash, and Boberg (2006: 72) as a merger before  in North American English that might require further study. The latter merger can also involve  or  before .

 Goat split 
The goat split is a process that has affected London dialects and Estuary English. In the first phase of the split, the diphthong of goat  developed an allophone  before "dark" (nonprevocalic) . Thus goal no longer had the same vowel as goat ( vs. ). In the second phase, the diphthong  spread to other forms of affected words. This led to the creation of a minimal pair for some speakers: wholly  vs. holy  and thus to phonemicization of the split.

In broad Cockney, the phonetic difference between the two phonemes may be rather small and they may be distinguished by nothing more than the openness of the first element, so that goat is pronounced  whereas goal is pronounced .

 Doll–dole merger 
As a result, doll and dole may become homophones.

Goose split
Similar to the Goat split, the Goose split is a process affecting some Southeastern English dialects, where the Goose vowel, which is typically , backs to  before . Also like the Goat split, the Goose split often affects related words, leading to minimal pairs, e.g. ruler (a king or queen)  with backing vs. ruler (a measuring device) , or cooler  vs. the name Kula . A similar backing change has occurred in many North American dialects, but this has remained allophonic.
Fool–fall merger

This neutralization has been found to exist for clusters of speakers in the southern UK, especially for speakers from areas of the south coast and the Greater London area.

Vile–vial merger

This merger involves the dephonemicization of schwa that occurs after a vowel and before , causing the vowel- sequence to be pronounced as either one or two syllables.

This merger may also be encountered with other vowel rhymes too, including:
This historically happened to the word squirrel, which was previously  (and still is in certain accents), but it actually became one syllable  in General American today.

Cockney speakers usually regard both syllables of awful as rhyming: .

In the case of cockney, the sixth column does not participate in the merger.

There is a large amount of potential homophones involving adjectives with the suffix -able and phrases consisting of a related verb, the indefinite article and the nouns bull, ball and boar. Again, phrases involving the noun boar are distinct for speakers with the thought split regardless of stress:  ('afford a boar').

Other mergers
Labov, Ash, and Boberg (2006:73) mention four mergers before  that may be under way in some accents of North American English, and which require more study:

See also
 Phonological history of the English language
 Phonological history of English vowels
 English-language vowel changes before historic r

References

Bibliography

 
 
 
 

Australian English
New Zealand English
American English
Splits and mergers in English phonology